Tugimaantee 14 (ofcl. abbr. T14), also called the Kose–Purila highway, is a 39.1-kilometre-long national basic road in central Estonia. The highway begins at Kose on national road 12 and ends at Purila on national road 15.

Route
T14 passes through the following counties and municipalities:
Harju County
Kose Parish
Rapla County
Rapla Parish

See also
 Transport in Estonia

References

External links

N14